Dexter Clift (born 8 April 1998), known professionally as River Medway, is an English drag queen who is best known for competing on the third series of RuPaul's Drag Race UK in 2021.

Biography
Dexter Clift was born in Medway, Kent, with her drag name coming from the River Medway that flows through her hometown. In 2021, Medway was announced as one of the drag queens competing in the third series of RuPaul's Drag Race UK. During her time on the show, Medway's runway look inspired by Thomas Fletcher Waghorn gained comedy attention on social media. She also discussed her mother dying from COVID-19, and revealed that she received a call for the show not long after her death. Medway was eliminated from the competition following the Snatch Game episode, alongside Choriza May after a lip sync to "Shout" resulted in RuPaul deciding to eliminate both of them in a double elimination. In 2022, Medway embarked on the RuPaul's Drag Race UK: The Official Tour alongside her fellow cast members. Medway is also set to join the cast of the show Death Drop: Back in the Habit, alongside Drag Race alumni Victoria Scone, Willam Belli and Cheryl Hole.

Filmography

Television

Stage

References 

Living people
English drag queens
People from Medway
RuPaul's Drag Race UK contestants
1998 births